Matthew Graham is a British television writer. 

Matthew or Matt Graham may also refer to:

Matt Graham (Scrabble), American comedian and Scrabble expert
Matt Graham (skier) (born 1994), Australian freestyle skier
Matt Graham (poker player), American poker player
Matt Graham (Blue Heelers), fictional character on Australian television drama Blue Heelers
Matt Graham (survivalist), co-star of the Dual Survival television series

See also
Matthew David Graham